Veronika of Desenice (died 17 October 1425) (Veronika z Desenic) was the second wife of Frederick II, Count of Celje.

Early life
Little is known of her early life. It is believed the name Deseniška derives from the village of Desinić in Croatia, where Frederick also had extensive estates, and it appears in the forms Dessnitz, Dessenitz, Desnicze, Teschnitz, Teschenitz, and Dessewitz in various historical sources.

Marriage and persecution
Veronika was of lesser status, and Frederick's father Hermann II was greatly opposed to the marriage. The chronicles of the Counts of Celje suggest he had his son arrested and, while holding him prisoner, initiated a trial against Veronika accusing her of witchcraft. She was acquitted by the court.

Murder
Despite the court's ruling, she was incarcerated in Ojstrica Castle near Tabor and murdered (supposedly on the orders of Hermann II) by being drowned in 1425. She was buried in Braslovče and a few years later Frederick arranged for her remains to be reburied at the Carthusian monastery at Jurklošter and in her memory also made an endowment to the monastery at Bistra.

In culture
Veronika and Frederick's tragic love story, which also marked the beginning of the end of the House of Cilli, has been an inspiration for numerous literary creations.

Among others, she was the protagonist of Josipina Turnograjska's 1851 story Nedolžnost in sila (Innocence and Force), Josip Jurčič's 1880 play Veronika Deseniška, Oton Župančič's 1924 play Veronika Deseniška, Bratko Kreft's 1932 play Celjski Grofje (The Counts of Celje), Danilo Švara's 1946 opera Veronika Deseniška, Franček Rudolf's 1968 play Celjski grof na žrebcu (The Count of Celje on a Stallion) and 1974 play Veronika, and Dušan Čater's 1996 children's novel Veronika Deseniška. She has also inspired works in Croatian, German, Czech, and Italian.

The Veronika Poetry Award and the Veronika Festival are named after Veronika of Desenice.

See also 

 Counts of Celje

References

House of Celje
Deaths by drowning
People murdered in Slovenia
1425 deaths
Year of birth unknown
Slovene mythology
15th-century Austrian people
People accused of witchcraft